The Casa Museo Leonora Carrington, formerly Casa Estudio or Casona Leonora Carrington, was the home of British surrealist painter and writer Leonora Carrington. It is found at Chihuahua Street 194, colonia Roma Norte, in the Cuauhtémoc borough of Mexico City. The museum operates digitally due to the COVID-19 pandemic in Mexico.

The house was restored by Universidad Autónoma Metropolitana (UAM) in 2018 and it was expected to open physically in 2022.

History 
Leonora Carrington lived in the house for more than 60 years, since 1948 until her death in 2011. It is a three-story mansion found in Chihuahua Street in colonia Roma Norte, Mexico City. There, she created most of her works and also raised her children with her husband Imre Weisz Schwarz, a Hungarian photographer.

In 2017, the Universidad Autónoma Metropolitana (UAM) acquired the house and the following year the house was repaired to be able to receive tourists and display more than 8,000 of the artist's objects. Ten years after Carrington's death, in 2021, the studio house was converted into a museum. It is expected to open to the public in 2022.

Gallery

See also 
 Museo Leonora Carrington
 Frida Kahlo Museum
 Luis Barragán House and Studio

References

External links 

 

2022 establishments in Mexico
Art museums and galleries in Mexico
Art museums established in 2022
Biographical museums in Mexico
Colonia Roma
Historic house museums in Mexico
Museums devoted to one artist
Museums in Mexico City
Universidad Autónoma Metropolitana